Gregory J. Markopoulos (March 12, 1928 – November 12, 1992) was an American experimental filmmaker.

Biography
Born in Toledo, Ohio in 1928 to Greek immigrant parents, Markopoulos began making 8 mm films at an early age. He attended USC Film School in the late 1940s, and went on to become a co-founder — with Jonas Mekas, Shirley Clarke, Stan Brakhage and others — of the New American Cinema movement. He was as well a contributor to Film Culture magazine, and an instructor at the Art Institute of Chicago.

In 1967, he and his partner Robert Beavers left the United States for permanent residence in Europe. Once ensconced in self-imposed exile, Markopoulos withdrew his films from circulation, refused any interviews, and insisted that a chapter about him be removed from the second edition of Visionary Film, P. Adams Sitney's seminal study of American avant-garde cinema. While he continued to make films, his work went largely unseen for almost 30 years.

Markopoulos dedicated his film (A)lter (A)ction to Rosa von Praunheim. Before von Praunheim became famous, he worked as an assistant-director for Markopoulos.

He died in 1992 in Freiburg im Breisgau.

Selected filmography 
 Du sang, de la volupté et de la mort (1947–48); 3 parts: Psyche, Lysis, Charmides
 The Dead Ones (1949, unfinished)
Christmas, U.S.A. (1949); 13 min.
 Swain (1950)
 Flowers of Asphalt (1951)
 Serenity (1961)
 Twice a Man (1963)
 Galaxie (1966)
 Ming Green (1966)
 Bliss (1967)
 Eros, O Basileus (1967)
 Himself As Herself (1967)
 The Illiac Passion (1964–67)
 Through a Lens Brightly: Mark Turbyfill (1967)
 The Divine Damnation (1968)
 Gammelion (1968)
 The Mysteries (1968)
 Index - Hans Richter (1969)
 The Olympian (1969)
 Political Portraits (1969)
 Sorrows (1969)
 Alph (1970)
 Genius (1970)
 Hagiographia (1970, first version)
 Moment (1970)
 Cimabue! Cimabue! (1971)
 Doldertal 7 (1971)
 Saint Actaeon (1971)
 35, Boulevard General Koenig (1971)
 Hagiographia (1973, second version)
 Heracles (1973)
 Meta (1973)
 Prosopographia (1976)
 Eniaios (1948-c.1990, 22 film cycles)

Preservation
Markopoulos' film Galaxie was preserved by the Academy Film Archive in 2001.

Bibliography 
Selected articles:
 Jones, Kristen M. Gregory J. Markopoulos - film exhibition at Whitney Museum of American Art Artforum Summer 1996.
 Sitney, P. Adams. Idyll Worship Artforum November 2004: 187–191. [PDF]
 Stout, Jeffrey and Noah Stout. Cinema Arcadia Film Comment September/October 2004: 64–65. [PDF]

References

External links 
Biography
Arcadians - Arcades esmen
The Temenos Association
Millennium Film Journal no. 32/33 Devoted to Markopoulos and Robert Beavers
Gregory Markopoulos: Seconds in Eternity from Bright Lights Film Journal

1928 births
1992 deaths
American experimental filmmakers
American film directors
USC School of Cinematic Arts alumni
American people of Greek descent
LGBT film directors
LGBT people from Ohio
20th-century American LGBT people